Pulicaria diversifolia is a species of flowering plant in the family Asteraceae.It is found only in Yemen. Its natural habitat is rocky areas.

References

diversifolia
Endemic flora of Socotra
Least concern plants
Taxonomy articles created by Polbot
Taxa named by Isaac Bayley Balfour